Skerdilaid Curri (born 6 October 1975) is a retired Albanian footballer who last played for FC Erzgebirge Aue. He also holds German citizenship.

Career statistics

International

National team statistics

Honours
Partizani Tirana
 Albanian Cup: 1996–97

References

External links
 
 
 
 

1975 births
Living people
Footballers from Kavajë
Albanian footballers
Association football midfielders
Association football forwards
Besa Kavajë players
FK Partizani Tirana players
SpVgg Unterhaching players
FC Erzgebirge Aue players
2. Bundesliga players
3. Liga players
Albanian expatriate footballers
Expatriate footballers in Germany
Albanian expatriate sportspeople in Germany